Herbert Palmer  may refer to:
Herbert Palmer (Puritan) (1601–1647), Puritan writer 
Herbert James Palmer (1851–1939), Canadian politician, Premier of Prince Edward Island
Herbert Richmond Palmer (1877–1958), British colonial governor
Herbert Edward Palmer (1880–1961), English poet
Herbert Sidney Palmer (1881-1970), Canadian painter

See also
George Herbert Palmer (1842–1933), American educator